Iarintsena is a rural commune in the  Central Highlands of Madagascar. It belongs to the district of Ambalavao, which is a part of Haute Matsiatra Region. The population of the commune was estimated to be approximately 22,000 in 2001.

Only primary schooling is available. The majority 80% of the population of the commune are farmers, while an additional 14% receives their livelihood from raising livestock. The most important crop is rice, while other important products are cassava and tobacco. Services provide employment for 5% of the population. Additionally fishing employs 1% of the population.

References and notes 

Populated places in Haute Matsiatra